Gabriel Pita da Veiga y Sanz (31 January 1909 – 8 May 1993) was a Spanish admiral who served as Minister of the Navy of Spain between 1973 and 1977, during the Francoist dictatorship.

References

1909 births
1993 deaths
Defence ministers of Spain
Government ministers during the Francoist dictatorship